Benito Madueño y Ramos (1654 – 11 May 1739) was a Roman Catholic prelate who served as Auxiliary Bishop of Toledo (1698–1739).

Biography
Benito Madueño y Ramos was born in Montoro in 1654. On 19 December 1698, he was appointed during the papacy of Pope Innocent XII as Auxiliary Bishop of Toledo and Titular Bishop of Sion. He was consecrated bishop in 1699. He served as Auxiliary Bishop of Toledo until his death on 11 May 1739.

Episcopal succession

References 

1654 births
1739 deaths
17th-century Roman Catholic bishops in Spain
18th-century Roman Catholic bishops in Spain
Bishops appointed by Pope Innocent XII